Luis Maria Zwick (born 24 May 1994) is a German professional footballer who plays as a goalkeeper for Berliner AK 07.

Zwick rose to prominence at the age of 21 after winning the starting spot at Dundee United, making 17 appearances in the Scottish Premiership. Following the arrival of Japanese international Eiji Kawashima, Zwick moved to German 3. Liga club Hansa Rostock. With playing time limited, he joined Hertha Berlin II on loan and in 2018, parted ways with parent club, Rostock. After a season with Optik Rathenow, he signed for Bayern powerhouses, Schweinfurt.

Early life
Born in Berlin, Germany, Zwick played for Teltower FV 1913, a youth football team, from the age of seven. Zwick began his career as a left midfielder, before becoming a goalkeeper in 2007. He moved to Hertha 03 Zehlendorf in 2009.

Career
Zwick signed for his first professional football club in 2014, playing for the development squad of Dundee United in Scotland. In 2015, he signed a professional contract with the club. He made his senior début on 2 August 2015, in a 1–0 loss to Aberdeen in the opening match of the 2015–16 Scottish Premiership season. On 8 August, Zwick kept a clean sheet in a 2–0 away win against Motherwell, on his second appearance for United.

Zwick was released by Dundee United when his contract expired at the end of the 2016–17 season. Returning to Germany, he signed for 3. Liga club Hansa Rostock in June 2017. Two months later, he left Rostock without having earned made any appearances and joined fourth tier club Hertha BSC II on a season-long loan.

After parting ways with Rostock following his loan spell with Hertha II, he joined FSV Optik Rathenow. There, a series of strong performances helped the club escape relegation and lead him to sign a three-year contract with Regionalliga Bayern powerhouse side, FC Schweinfurt. In 2020-21, Zwick captained Schweinfurt in the first-round proper of the DFB Pokal against Bundesliga side, Schalke 04, losing 4-1.

Career statistics

Honours
Dundee United
 Scottish Challenge Cup: 2016–17
1. FC Schweinfurt 05
Regionalliga Bayern: 2019–21

References

External links

1994 births
Living people
Footballers from Berlin
German footballers
Association football goalkeepers
3. Liga players
Scottish Professional Football League players
Regionalliga players
Hertha Zehlendorf players
Dundee United F.C. players
FC Hansa Rostock players
Hertha BSC II players
1. FC Schweinfurt 05 players
Berliner AK 07 players
German expatriate footballers
German expatriate sportspeople in Scotland
Expatriate footballers in Scotland